Moqsam (also known as Sar Maqsam) is a village in Takht Rural District, Takht District, Bandar Abbas County, Hormozgan Province, Iran. At the 2006 census, its population was 110, in 26 families.

References 

Populated places in Bandar Abbas County